Deh Tang is a village in Rahdar Rural District, in the Central District of Rudan County, Hormozgan Province, Iran. At the 2006 census, its population was 26, in 5 families.

References 

Populated places in Rudan County